Concerning Miss Marlowe is an American daytime television serial that was broadcast on NBC from July 5, 1954, until July 1, 1955.

Plot
The title character was 40-year-old Maggie Marlowe, whose husband succumbed to pneumonia shortly before the birth of their daughter. The impoverished mother allowed her in-laws to take the child to raise. Returning to her acting career, she fell in love with a married man and tried to restore relations with her estranged daughter. By April 1955, Marlowe was no longer an actress; she had become "a middleclass house frau with a tacky smock and a worry for every gray hair in her little head."

Sponsor and promotion
Procter & Gamble initially sponsored the program "on an alternate-day basis". In September 1955, the company held a Talent Discovery contest with the show's star, director, and producer as judges. Miles Laboratories became a sponsor in the fall of 1954.

The serial originated at WNBT-TV in New York City. It was replaced by It Pays to Be Married.

Personnel
Characters in Concerning Miss Marlowe and the actors and actresses who portrayed them are shown in the table below.

Hugh James was the announcer. Tom McDermott was the producer, and Larry White was the director. John Pickard and Frank Provo were the writers.

References 

NBC original programming
1954 American television series debuts
1955 American television series endings
Black-and-white American television shows
English-language television shows
American television soap operas